Sunil Bharti Mittal (born 23 October 1957) is an Indian billionaire businessman and philanthropist.He is the founder and chairperson of Bharti Enterprises, which has diversified interests in telecom, insurance, real estate, education, malls, hospitality, Agri and food besides other ventures. Bharti Airtel, the group's flagship company is one of the world's largest and India's largest telecom company with operations in 18 countries across Asia and Africa with a customer base of over 399 million.

In 2007, he was awarded the Padma Bhushan, India's third highest civilian honor. On 15 June 2016, he was elected as Chairman of the International Chamber of Commerce.

Early life
Sunil Bharti Mittal was born in intercaste Agarwal-Khatri family. His father, Sat Paul Mittal, had been the Member of Parliament, Rajya Sabha (Indian National Congress) from Ludhiana, Punjab, he was elected from Punjab for two terms (1976 & 1982) and nominated to the Rajya Sabha once (1988). He first joined the Wynberg Allen School in Mussoorie, but later attended Scindia School at Gwalior and he graduated in 1976 from Panjab University, Chandigarh, with a Bachelor of Arts and Science for which he studied in Arya College, Ludhiana. His father died of cardiac arrest in 1992.

Entrepreneurial ventures
A first-generation entrepreneur, Sunil started his first business in April 1976 at the age of 18, with a capital investment of  borrowed from his father. His first business was to make crankshafts for local bicycle manufacturers.

In 1980, he along with his brothers Rakesh Mittal and Rajan Mittal started an Import Enterprise named Bharti Overseas Trading Company. He sold his bicycle parts and yarn factories and moved to Mumbai. In 1981, he purchased importing licenses from exporting companies in Punjab. He then imported thousands of Suzuki Motors's portable electric-power generators from Japan. The importing of generators was suddenly banned by the then Indian Government.

In 1984, he started assembling push-button phones in India, which he earlier used to import from a Taiwan company, Kingtel, replacing the old fashioned, bulky rotary phones that were in use in the country then. Bharti Telecom Limited (BTL) was incorporated and entered into a technical tie up with Siemens AG of Germany for manufacture of electronic push button phones. By the early 1990s, Sunil was making fax machines, cordless phones and other telecom gear. Sunil says, "In 1983, the government imposed a ban on the import of gensets. I was out of business overnight. Everything I was doing came to a screeching halt. I was in trouble. The question then was: what should I do next? Then, opportunity came calling. While in Taiwan, I noticed the popularity of the push-button phone – something which India hadn't seen then. We were still using those rotary dials with no speed dials or redials. I sensed my chance and embraced the telecom business. I started marketing telephones, answering/fax machines under the brand name Beetel and the company picked up really fast.". He named his first push-button phones as 'Mitbrau'.

In 1992, he successfully bid for one of the four mobile phone network licenses auctioned in India. One of the conditions for the Delhi cellular license was that the bidder have some experience as a telecom operator. So, Mittal clinched a deal with the French telecom group Vivendi. He was one of the first Indian entrepreneurs to identify the mobile telecom business as a major growth area. His plans were finally approved by the Government in 1994 and he launched services in Delhi in 1995, when Bharti Cellular Limited (BCL) was formed to offer cellular services under the brand name AirTel in 1997. Within a few years Bharti became the first telecom company to cross the 2-million mobile subscriber mark. Bharti also brought down the STD/ISD cellular rates in India under brand name 'Indiaone'.

In May 2008, it emerged that Sunil Bharti Mittal was exploring the possibility of buying the MTN Group, a South Africa-based telecommunications company with coverage in 21 countries in Africa and the Middle East. The Financial Times reported that Bharti was considering offering US$45 billion for a 100% stake in MTN, which would be the largest overseas acquisition ever by an Indian firm. However, both sides emphasize the tentative nature of the talks, while The Economist magazine noted, "If anything, Bharti would be marrying up," as MTN has more subscribers, higher revenues and broader geographic coverage. However, the talks fell apart as MTN group tried to reverse the negotiations by making Bharti almost a subsidiary of the new company. In May 2009, Bharti Airtel again confirmed that it was in talks with MTN and the companies agreed to discuss the potential transaction exclusively by 31 July 2009. Talks eventually ended without agreement, some sources stating that this was due to opposition from the South African government.

In June 2010, Bharti led by Mittal acquired the African business of Zain Telecom for $10.7 billion (enterprise value) making it the largest ever acquisition by an Indian telecom firm. In 2012, Bharti tied up with Wal-Mart, the US retail giant, to start a number of retail stores across India. In 2014, Bharti planned to acquire Loop Mobile for INR 7 billion, but the deal was called off later. His son Kavin Bharti Mittal is the CEO and founder of hike Messenger.

In September 2010, Mittal's son, Shravin Mittal, joined Bharti Airtel as a manager having worked for Merrill Lynch in New York and Ernst & Young in London.

In 2012, Mittal took Bharti Infratel public with an IPO that raised $760 million. Mittal noted that the sale, considered by many to be only a modest success, was a "strong endorsement from qualified investors". The board was restructured ahead of the IPO with Mittal remaining as Chairman and Managing Director. After the IPO, shares of Bharti Infratel dropped sharply at the commencement of trading.

In 2013, Mittal was ordered to appear before a special Delhi court to answer questions about the additional allocation of airwaves to certain companies. Allegations against Mittal state that there had been collusion with key telecoms officials in the government to illegally secure an extra spectrum. No charges were issued against Mittal, however the trial court judge noted that there was enough material on record to proceed.

In late 2013, Mittal announced the acquisition of Warid Congo, making Bharti Airtel the largest telecoms provider in the Republic of Congo.

In 2015, Sunil Mittal announced that he would be joining the board of Oneweb, a space internet company. Mittal was one of the investors in a $500 million investment round that included Coca-Cola, Virgin and Qualcomm.

In 2016, Mittal made changes at Bharti Airtel to enable the company to compete against the launch of Jio. in the race to become India's largest telecom company.

In 2017, Mittal announced "war on roaming" by scrapping charges for outgoing and incoming calls within India as well as international roaming charges.

Philanthropy
Mittal has also been working towards educating India through the Bharti Foundation, which is the philanthropic arm of Bharti Enterprises. The Foundation has established schools in villages across India and offers free quality education with free books, uniform and mid day meals to poor children.

Satya Bharti School Program' – the Foundation's flagship program is running 254 schools in six States serving over 45,000 rural children, free of cost. The other educational initiatives including the – Satya Bharti School, Quality Support and Learning Centre Programs, are currently reaching out to over  underprivileged children in 11 states. Other Program of the Foundation making considerable impact among the underprivileged sections is – 'Satya Bharti Abhiyan' (Sanitation).

In 2017, the Bharti Family pledged 10% of their wealth (approx. Rs 70 billion) towards Philanthropy to set up Satya Bharti University, a world-class University to offer education to deserving youth from economically weaker sections of society

Mittal has been married "for decades" to Nyna Mittal, a philanthropist who focuses on education.  The couple has one daughter and two sons, who are twins, born August 31, 1987.  The daughter, Eiesha Bharti Pasricha, a "lifestyle investor," lives in London with her husband, businessman Sharan Pasricha, and their two children.  One son, Kavin Bharti Mittal, is an entrepreneur and the founder and CEO of Hike, a New Delhi-headquartered tech and internet startup.  The other son, Shravin Bharti Mittal, is the founder and CEO of Unbound, a London-based venture capital and private equity firm, and a director of Bharti Global Ltd, a London-headquartered firm in the Bharti corporate family.  He was reportedly instrumental in the successful acquisition of OneWeb.  In April 2015, in Delhi, Shavrin married Sakshi Chhabra.

Awards and recognition 
 Padma Bhushan, Government of India, 2007
 Transforming India Leader, NDTV Business Leader Awards
 GSM Association's chairman's Award, 2008
 Asia Businessman of the Year, Fortune Magazine, 2006
 Telecom Person of the Year, Voice & Data magazine (India), 2006
 CEO of the year, Frost and Sullivan Asia Pacific ICT awards, 2006
 CEO of the year, 2005–06, Business Standard
 Best Asian Telecom CEO, Telecom Asia Awards, 2005
 Best C.E.O, India, Institutional Investor, 2005
 Business Leader of the Year, Economic Times, 2005
 Philanthropist of the Year Award, The Asian Awards, 2010
 INSEAD Business Leader Award, 2011
 Honoris Causa Doctorate of Sciences (D.Sc.) Degree, Amity University Gurgaon, 2016
 Honoris Causa Doctorate of Sciences (D.Sc.) Degree, Shri Mata Vaishno Devi University, Katra, J&K, 2018
 Doctor Honoris Causa, ESCP Business School, ESCP Europe, Paris, 2018
 Global Mobile Industry Honours Sunil Bharti Mittal for his contributions to the Global Mobile Industry as Chairman of the GSMA Board, 2019
Business Leader of the Year at The Economic Times Awards for Corporate Excellence 2022

Industry associations and affiliations  
 Chairman, GSM Association, 2017–19
 Honorary Chairman, International Chamber of Commerce (ICC)
 Member, Telecom Board of International Telecommunication Union (ITU), the leading UN agency for Information and Communication Technology Commissioner, Broadband Commission for Sustainable Digital Development at ITU
 Chair, World Economic Forum's Telecommunications Steering Committee
 Member, International Business Council, World Economic Forum
 Member, Board of Directors, Qatar Foundation Endowment
 Member, Board of Directors, SoftBank Corp. (2011–2013)
 Member, Board of Directors, Unilever PLC and Unilever NV (2011–2013)
 Member, International Advisory Committee to the Board of Directors, NYSE Euronext (2008– 2011)
 Member, Board of Directors, Standard Chartered Bank Plc (2007–2009)
 Member, Board of Directors, Hero Honda Motors (2006–2009)
 President, Confederation of Indian Industry (CII) (2007–2008)
 Co-chairman, Annual Meeting, World Economic Forum, Davos (2007)
 Member, Board of Global GSM Association (2003–2007)

Academia
 Member, Global Advisory Council, Harvard University 
 Member, Vice Chancellor’s Circle of Advisors on India, University of Cambridge
 Member, Board of Dean Advisors, Harvard Business School (2010 – 2019)
 Member, Governing Body, London Business School (2010 – 2013)

Global Trade
 Co-Chair, Trade & Investment Development Task Force, B20 Argentina (2018)
 Co-Chair, Trade & Investment Development Task Force, B20 Germany (2017)
 Co-Chair, SME Development Taskforce, B20 China (2016)

References

External links

 Profile at Bharti Enterprises  
 Profile at Forbes  
 Profile at Bloomberg L.P.  
 Sunil Bharti Mittal Interviews at Harvard Business School 
 Sunil Mittal collected news and commentary at The Times of India  

 

1957 births
20th-century Indian businesspeople
21st-century Indian businesspeople 
Aggarwal
Bharti Enterprises
Businesspeople from Ludhiana
Carnegie Endowment for International Peace 
Living people
Marwari people
Indian billionaires
Indian corporate directors
Indian chief executives
Indian chairpersons of corporations 
Indian businesspeople in telecommunications 
Recipients of the Padma Bhushan in trade and industry
Panjab University alumni
Scindia School alumni
Unilever people
Punjabi Hindus